The Kommando Territoriale Aufgaben der Bundeswehr short (KdoTerrAufgBw) "Bundeswehr Territorial Tasks Command" of the Bundeswehr is based in the Julius-Leber- Kaserne (Barracks)  in Berlin-Wedding was founded in 2013 and is in charge of all territorial tasks of the forces as well as for the support of the civil administration.

Organisation 
The Kommando Territoriale Aufgaben der Bundeswehr is under the command of the Streitkräftebasis (SKB) (Joint Support Service) and leads the following tasks on its behalf:
 16 Landeskommandos (LKdo) (including, in Bayern, Landesregiment Bayern) 
 Local reservist companies (:de:Regionale Sicherungs- und Unterstützungskräfte (RSUKr))
 Professional Sportsmen of the Bundeswehr (SpFördGrpBw)
 Multinational CIMIC Command (MN CIMIC CMD) in Nienburg/Weser
 Wachbataillon (WachBtl BMVg)
 Proving grounds of the Bundeswehr (TrÜbPl)

The Kommando Territoriale Aufgaben der Bundeswehr besides the Führungsunterstützungskommando der Bundeswehr and the Logistikkommando der Bundeswehr one of three new established Ability-Commands of the Joint Support Service (SKB). It is an equivalent to a Division.

References 

Civil affairs
Military units and formations established in 2013
Bundeswehr
German Army (1956–present)
Buildings and structures in Mitte
Branches of the Bundeswehr